The 1974 Soviet Cup was an association football cup competition of the Soviet Union. The winner of the competition, Dinamo Kiev qualified for the continental tournament.

Competition schedule

Preliminary round
 [Mar 6, 10] 
 KRYLYA SOVETOV Kuibyshev   2-0  0-1  Spartak Ordzhonikidze
   [1. Ravil Aryapov 3, ?. Att: 1,000 (in Sochi)] 
   [2. Vladimir Mozzhukhin 68 (in Eshera)] 
 Kuban Krasnodar            1-1  0-2  SPARTAK Ivano-Frankovsk 
   [1. Alexandr Podgornov 80 - Viktor Anistratov 65. Att: 7,000] 
   [2. Viktor Anistratov 2, Boris Streltsov 19. Att: 5,000] 
 PAMIR Dushanbe             0-0  2-1  UralMash Sverdlovsk     [both legs in Dushanbe] 
   [1. Att: 5,000] 
   [2. Alexandr Pogorelov, Arsen Petrosov – Alexandr Zhuravlyov. Att: 8,000] 
 Stroitel Ashkhabad         0-1  1-1  SPARTAK Nalchik 
   [1. Vitaliy Mirzoyev. Att: 1,500] 
   [2. Vasiliy Karpov - Abdul Mustafin. Att: 7,000] 
 TAVRIA Simferopol          2-2  3-2  Kuzbass Kemerovo        [both legs in Simferopol]
   [1. Andrei Cheremisin 3, Vasiliy Ryashin (K) 24 og – Vasiliy Ryashin 25, Sergei Timofeyev 57. Att: 13,000] 
   [2. Nikolai Klimov 17, 30, Andrei Cheremisin 68 – Vladimir Razdayev 19, Vitaliy Razdayev 48. Att: 9,500] 
 Torpedo Kutaisi            2-1  0-1  SHINNIK Yaroslavl 
   [1. Merab Chakhunashvili, Jemal Kherkhadze - Vladimir Korotkov. Att: 5,000 (in Leselidze)]
   [2. Valeriy Frolov 60. Att: 3,000 (in Adler)]
 Zvezda Perm                1-1  0-3  TEXTILSHCHIK Ivanovo 
   [1. Vladimir Solovyov 64 pen – Alexandr Tulbin 53 pen. Att: 1,500 (in Sochi)]
   [2. Vladimir Savinov 44, Alexandr Tulbin 66, Mikhail Potapov 69. Att: 4,000 (in Kislovodsk)]

First round
 [Mar 14, 17] 
 Textilshchik Ivanovo       0-1  0-2  SPARTAK Moskva            [both legs in Sochi] 
   [1. Vladimir Redin 70. Att: 8,000] 
   [2. Valeriy Andreyev, Alexandr Kasimtsev. Att: 1,000] 
 ZENIT Leningrad            2-0  1-0  Spartak Ivano-Frankovsk 
   [1. Georgiy Khromchenkov 13, 43. Att: 2,000 (in Sochi)] 
   [2. Mikhail Fokin 9. Att: 10,000] 
 [Mar 14, 18] 
 DNEPR Dnepropetrovsk       5-0  0-1  Krylya Sovetov Kuibyshev  [both legs in Sochi]
   [1. Pyotr Slobodyan 16, ?, Anatoliy Grinko 36, Valeriy Porkuyan 65, Stanislav Yevseyenko 81. Att: 5,000] 
   [2. Valeriy Korablyov. Att: 1,000] 
 Karpaty Lvov               1-0  0-2  SKA Rostov-na-Donu    [aet] 
   [1. Lev Brovarskiy 38. Att: 30,000] 
   [2. Viktor Churkin 68, Yevgeniy Khrabrostin 107. Att: 25,000] 
 Metallurg Lipetsk          0-0  0-1  DINAMO Moskva 
   [1. Att: 5,000 (in Sochi)] 
   [2. Vladimir Kozlov 78 pen. Att: 3,000 (in Leselidze)] 
 Metallurg Zaporozhye       0-0  0-2  TORPEDO Moskva 
   [1. Att: 18,800] 
   [2. Vladimir Yurin 36, Vadim Nikonov 83. Att: 200 (in Adler)] 
 NEFTCHI Baku               3-0  1-2  Pahtakor Tashkent 
   [1. Tofik Abbasov 19, 54, Nikolai Smolnikov 73. Att: 10,000] 
   [2. Abdulgani Nurmamedov 86 – Viktor Varyukhin 75, Berador Abduraimov 90 pen. Att: 25,000] 
 Nistru Kishinev            0-0  0-3  CHERNOMORETS Odessa 
   [1. Att: 25,000] 
   [2. Viktor Tomashevskiy 72, Vladimir Dzyuba 77, Igor Ivanenko 86. Att: 20,000] 
 Pamir Dushanbe             1-1  1-3  DINAMO Tbilisi 
   [1. Alexandr Pogorelov 43 – Vladimir Gutsayev 78. Att: 22,000] 
   [2. Arsen Petrosov 85 – David Kipiani 5, 11 pen, 83. Att: 30,000] 
 SHAKHTYOR Donetsk          2-1  0-0  Lokomotiv Moskva 
   [1. Alexei Ovchinnikov (L) 8 og, Yuriy Vankevich 40 – Yuriy Chesnokov 42. Att: 14,000] 
   [2. Att: 200 (in Hosta)] 
 Shinnik Yaroslavl          0-0  1-2  ARARAT Yerevan 
   [1. (in Adler)] 
   [2. Boris Rybin 52 - Eduard Markarov 21, Oganes Zanazanyan 22. Att: 32,000] 
 Tavria Simferopol          2-1  0-1  KAYRAT Alma-Ata 
   [1. Nikolai Klimov 5, 55 – Anatoliy Ionkin 71. Att: 10,000] 
   [2. Anatoliy Ionkin 78 pen. (in Sochi)]
 [Mar 14, 19] 
 Dinamo Minsk               1-3  2-0  ZARYA Voroshilovgrad 
   [1. Vladimir Kurnev pen – Viktor Kuznetsov, Yuriy Yeliseyev, Anatoliy Shakun. Att: 1,500 (in Eshera)]
   [2. Igor Grigoryev 28, 66. Att: 5,000 (in Sochi)] 
 [Mar 15, 19] 
 CSKA Moskva                0-0  2-0  Spartak Nalchik 
   [1. Att: 10,000 (in Poti)] 
   [2. Alexandr Kozlovskikh 52, Boris Kopeikin ?. Att: 18,000]

Second round
 [Apr 6, May 27] 
 ARARAT Yerevan             2-0  1-1  Neftchi Baku 
   [1. Sergei Bondarenko, Oganes Zanazanyan. Att: 30,000] 
   [2. Arkadiy Andriasyan 82 – Tofik Abbasov 37. Att: 35,000] 
 Chernomorets Odessa        0-2  1-2  DINAMO Tbilisi 
   [1. Vissarion Mchedlishvili 42, 47. Att: 32,000] 
   [2. Vladimir Grigoryev 66 – Vladimir Gutsayev 57, Givi Nodia ?. Att: 10,000] 
 DINAMO Moskva              3-1  2-1  Zenit Leningrad 
   [1. Vladimir Kozlov 23, Anatoliy Baidachny 30, 70 – Anatoliy Zinchenko 58. Att: 25,000 (in Tashkent)]
   [2. Vadim Pavlenko 56, Gennadiy Yevryuzhikhin 57 – Vladimir Kazachonok 63. Att: 40,000] 
 DNEPR Dnepropetrovsk       1-0  1-1  CSKA Moskva 
   [1. Anatoliy Grinko 74. Att: 25,000] 
   [2. Stanislav Yevseyenko 39 – Boris Kopeikin 41] 
 Kayrat Alma-Ata            2-3  0-4  ZARYA Voroshilovgrad 
   [1. Georgiy Martyan 41, 46 – Yuriy Yeliseyev 11, 58, Yuriy Vasenin 76. Att: 30,000] 
   [2. Yuriy Yeliseyev 42, Anatoliy Kuksov 49, Viktor Stulchin 71, Sergei Andreyev 89. Att: 7,000] 
 SHAKHTYOR Donetsk          2-0  2-0  SKA Rostov-na-Donu 
   [1. Alexandr Vasin 10, Anatoliy Konkov 76 pen. Att: 33,000] 
   [2. Vitaliy Starukhin 61, Alexandr Vasin 63. Att: 20,000] 
 Torpedo Moskva             0-0  0-0  SPARTAK Moskva        [pen 6-7] 
   [1. Att: 6,000 (in Sochi)] 
   [2. Att: 16,000]

Quarterfinals
 [Jun 15, 21] 
 Ararat Yerevan             2-1  0-3  SHAKHTYOR Donetsk 
   [1. Arkadiy Andriasyan 10, Eduard Markarov 84 – Yuriy Dudinskiy 76. Att: 30,000] 
   [2. Vitaliy Starukhin 25, 81, Yuriy Dudinskiy 30. Att: 25,000] 
 DINAMO Tbilisi             2-0  1-3  Dinamo Moskva         [pen 4-3] 
   [1. Ucha Kantaria 31, Manuchar Machaidze 37. Att: 15,000] 
   [2. Manuchar Machaidze 96 – Vladimir Kozlov 59, 82, Vadim Pavlenko 95. Att: 20,000] 
 Dnepr Dnepropetrovsk       2-3  1-2  DINAMO Kiev 
   [1. Stanislav Yevseyenko 21, Pyotr Naida 89 pen – Yuriy Kovalyov 34, Oleg Blokhin 48, Vladimir Muntyan 54. Att: 20,000] 
   [2. Yuriy Solovyov 12 – Vitaliy Shevchenko 59, Leonid Buryak 64. Att: 30,000] 
 Spartak Moskva             0-0  0-1  ZARYA Voroshilovgrad 
   [1. Att: 15,000] 
   [2. Gennadiy Shilin 64. Att: 15,000]

Semifinals
 [Jun 28, Jul 5] 
 DINAMO Kiev                1-0  0-0  Dinamo Tbilisi 
   [1. Oleg Blokhin 56. Att: 20,000] 
   [2. Att: 35,000] 
 ZARYA Voroshilovgrad       2-1  2-3  Shakhtyor Donetsk 
   [1. Yuriy Yeliseyev 39, Viktor Kuznetsov 74 – Yuriy Gubich 62] 
   [2. Vladimir Belousov 16, Viktor Kuznetsov 51 – Yuriy Gubich 32, Vitaliy Starukhin 88, Vladimir Zakharov 90]

Final

External links
 Complete calendar. helmsoccer.narod.ru
 1974 Soviet Cup. Footballfacts.ru
 1974 Soviet football season. RSSSF

Soviet Cup seasons
Cup
Soviet Cup
Soviet Cup